Debro is a settlement in the hills above the right bank of the Savinja River River in the Municipality of Laško in eastern Slovenia. The area is part of the traditional region of Styria. It is now included with the rest of the municipality in the Savinja Statistical Region.

References

External links
Debro on Geopedia

Populated places in the Municipality of Laško